The Rhins of Galloway, otherwise known as the Rhins of Wigtownshire (or as The Rhins, also spelt The Rhinns), is a hammer-head peninsula in Dumfries and Galloway, Scotland.

The principal settlements are Stranraer at the head of Loch Ryan and the small tourist village of Portpatrick on the west coast, other villages are dotted up and down the peninsula, including Kirkcolm, Leswalt, Lochans, and in the South Rhins; Stoneykirk, Sandhead, Ardwell and Drummore.

Herbert Maxwell defines "Rhinns" as rionn, rinn, meaning a point or promontory.

Geography and climate

The peninsula is bounded on its west coast by the North Channel and by Loch Ryan and Luce Bay in the east. The coastal landscape varies: the west coast has steep rugged cliffs and occasional inlets, but the calmer eastern coast has sandy beaches and a softer landscape.

As the land is almost surrounded by sea, its temperature is significantly stabilised by the North Atlantic drift, which cools the land in summer and warms it in winter. Thus there are few severe frosts. This allows the survival of numerous tropical palms and flora which otherwise could not exist this far north. Examples of these tropical plants can be seen at the Logan Botanic Garden.

The natural geography of the Rhins has led directly to the use of the area for development: the entire peninsula acts as a huge breakwater against the currents of the North Channel and to a lesser extent the Atlantic. This creates relatively calm and safe navigable waters in Loch Ryan and Luce Bay. They are notably used by the ferries that sail to Belfast and Larne, which were originally based at Portpatrick. As the ships became larger they required larger protective harbours, and the exposed Portpatrick was no longer suitable, so they moved to the shelter of Loch Ryan from where they still sail today.

The southernmost point of the Rhinns is also the southernmost point in Scotland, the Mull of Galloway. Here the land and rocky cliffs support a diverse range of animals and plants, with the Mull area designated a Site of Special Scientific Interest and also a RSPB nature reserve. Razorbills, guillemots and puffins are three of the bird species which nest on the steep cliffs.

Just north of the Mull, south Rhins, the land narrows significantly, forming an isthmus dividing two bays (the East and West Tarbets). In ancient times boats were brought ashore and moved across the isthmus by manpower, with the aid of log rollers and lubrication. This purpose of all this effort was to avoid navigating around the Mull with its dangerous currents.

The Southern Upland Way begins in the Rhins at Portpatrick and winds its way through the area on its long journey east across Scotland to its finish at Cockburnspath.

History and settlements
In the South Rhins the Britons were commemorated by the name of a farm, Drumbreddan, "the ridge of the Britons". They built substantial fortifications, like the one between East and West Tarbet, which defends the Mull of Galloway against marauders from the north.

Having been settled from ancient times, the area has a long history, forming part of the western kingdoms that collectively ruled most of western Scotland, parts of Ireland and the Isle of Man. The Novantae Celtic tribe was based in the Rhins area, which the Romans called Novantarum Peninsula. When Agricola was in Britain in 81 AD, a road was built from Dalswinton west to the Rhins, terminating at Stranraer on the southwestern tip of Loch Ryan, leading some to argue that if Agricola did attack Ireland, he would have done so from this location.

Subsistence, Crofting, lifestyles are likely to have been dominant throughout much of the peninsula's history.   Farming would have been practised to satisfy the needs of the tenants and, later on, the estates.  Fishing would have generally been practised on a local scale for local consumption rather than export. Due to the very sparse populations that lived in the area it was not until the Industrial Revolution that changes from a basic subsistence crofting lifestyle would be noted.

Resources in the area were traditionally used locally and increasingly exported.  Salt Pans on the western coast of the peninsula were used for centuries as a local source of salt.  Kelp harvesting became increasingly popular, both for local uses and also exported for use in chemical production.  Sands, silts and gravels, common to all glaciated alluvial areas were frequently quarried.

As communications improved the wealth of the area improved, with the sea links to Ireland, Glasgow & Liverpool both allowing the export of local farming produce (thus encouraging farming for production rather than subsistence) and also import of materials and goods not common to the area.  The importance of the area's proximity to Ireland led to significant infrastructure being developed, most notably the link to the railway network, which was laid to Portpatrick to ensure a fast passage for the mail boat to Donaghadee.  As the ships which served the North Channel route increased in size it became more difficult for Portpatrick to offer a safe harbour, with the shipping routes eventually moving in 1849 to the calmer waters of Stranraer Harbour in Loch Ryan.

During the Second World War the area became an important station for anti-U-boat activities, with flying boats operating from the Loch side of the peninsula at RAF Station Wig Bay, as well as RAF Station Stranraer.   RAF Corsewall operated north of Kirkcolm and was mainly used as a training school for flying boats.  The bombing range in Luce Bay was used extensively throughout the second world war, with facilities based at West Freugh and Drummore

In modern times the peninsula consists of a patchwork of farms running the full length of the land.  Increasingly the area is diversifying into tourism as small scale farming becomes less economically viable.  The natural environment of the area, with its long rugged coastline and numerous small bays attracts some tourism.  The relatively sparse population is also a key asset, in a time when many tourist locations are suffering over-popularity. The natural environment of the area saw the BBC deciding to film the drama Two Thousand Acres of Sky in the village of Port Logan.

Sites of interest in and around the Rhinns include:

Corsewall Lighthouse, sitting at the northern end of the peninsula, it is now a four star hotel
Lochnaw Castle near Leswalt which is the ancestral seat of Clan Agnew
West Freugh RAF station near Stoneykirk which was (and to a lesser extent still is) used by the RAF as an airfield for bombing target practice out in Luce Bay
Dunskey Castle near Portpatrick, built in the 16th century by the Adairs of Kilhilt, with now only the remains remaining
Port Logan village, where the BBC drama Two Thousand Acres of Sky was filmed, and the nearby Logan outstation of the Royal Botanic Garden, Edinburgh.
Ardwell House & Gardens near Ardwell, the estate house and gardens of Ardwell estates
Kirkmadrine Stones near Sandhead, earliest Christian activity on the peninsula, with the site established in the 5th century.
The Mull of Galloway, lighthouse and RSPB nature reserve

See also
 Kingdom of the Rhinns
 Stranraer railway station

References

External links
Mull of Galloway
Visit Stranraer and the Rhins
Stranraer

 
Peninsulas of Scotland
Landforms of Dumfries and Galloway